Grizzly Mountain is a  mountain summit located in Glacier National Park, in the Hermit Range of the Selkirk Mountains in British Columbia, Canada. The closest peak to Grizzly is Ursus Minor Mountain,  to the west-southwest, and its nearest higher peak is Mount Sifton,  to the north. The first ascent of the mountain was made August 31, 1901, by John E. Bushnell, August S. Eggers, Karl Schuluneggar, and Friedrich Michel via the southeast couloir. The first ascent of the north ridge was made in 1921 by Neal Carter, Tom Fyles, and Don Munday. The mountain's name was adopted in 1906, then re-approved September 8, 1932, by the Geographical Names Board of Canada. It was so-named because of its proximity above Bear Creek (since renamed Connaught Creek), and in keeping with the bear theme of other nearby features such as Ursus Major Mountain, Ursus Minor Mountain, Bruins Pass, and Balu Pass.


Climate
Based on the Köppen climate classification, Grizzly Mountain is located in a subarctic climate zone with cold, snowy winters, and mild summers. Temperatures can drop below −20 °C with wind chill factors below −30 °C. Precipitation runoff from the mountain and meltwater from a small unnamed glacier on its northwest slope drains into tributaries of the Beaver River and Illecillewaet River.

See also

 Geography of British Columbia
 Geology of British Columbia

References

Two-thousanders of British Columbia
Selkirk Mountains
Glacier National Park (Canada)
Columbia Country
Kootenay Land District